Cerberilla mosslandica is a species of sea slug, an aeolid nudibranch, a marine heterobranch mollusc in the family Aeolidiidae.

Distribution
This species was described from Monterey Bay, California. It has been reported from near Duncan, Vancouver Island, British Columbia, Canada. A specimen from St Peter the Great Bay, Russia had more white pigment and lines on the cerata and may be a different species.

Description
All Cerberilla species have a broad foot and the cerata are numerous, arranged in transverse rows across the body. In this species the body is mostly translucent white with a pinkish hue on the head. The digestive gland is darker pink. The tips of the rhinophores and cerata are covered with opaque white pigment and there are white pigment spots on the outer part of the oral tentacles. This species has short oral tentacles and large rhinophores for a Cerberilla and may be a species of Aeolidiella.

Ecology 
Species of Cerberilla live on and in sandy substrates where they burrow beneath the surface and feed on burrowing sea anemones.

References

Aeolidiidae
Gastropods described in 1975